This is a discography of works by Pat Metheny.

Studio albums

Live albums

Soundtracks

Compilation albums

Other albums

Pat Metheny Group

Pat Metheny Unity Band

Pat Metheny Unity Group

Pat Metheny Trio

Collaborations

With Brad Mehldau

Duets

Trios

Quartets

With The Heath Brothers

Gary Burton projects

Appearances

Other

References

Jazz discographies
Discographies of American artists